Omni-Play Basketball is a 1989 video game published by SportTime.

Gameplay
Omni-Play Basketball is a game in which the player has the ability to be the coach, the general manager, and the star player in this five-on-five full court basketball game.

Reception
Michael S. Chaut and Matt Rosenburg reviewed the game for Computer Gaming World, and stated that "The gameplay as well as the real-life aspects of the game seem to be covered completely. Overall, this game is a must for the sports simulation and statistical buff as well as the multi-player game fan. The game also takes into account whether the player is a "joystick jockey" or not and allows a set-up where strategy is the main concern. Considering the expandability factor and the flexibility in game play, SportTime's Omni-Play Basketball is tops!"

Mike Siggins reviewed Omni-Play Basketball for Games International magazine, and gave it 3 stars out of 5, and stated that "It represents a worthwhile purchase for those with a liking for the sport and some skill with arcade-type systems. Don't expect too many thrills though."

Reviews
All Game Guide - 1998
ACE (Advanced Computer Entertainment) - Sep, 1989
Commodore User - Sep, 1989
Computer and Video Games - Sep, 1989

References

External links
Review in Compute!
Review in Compute!'s Gazette
Review in Info

1989 video games
Amiga games
Basketball video games
Commodore 64 games
DOS games
Magic Johnson
Video games based on real people
Video games developed in the United States
Video games set in the United States